Cole Popovich (born February 15, 1985) is an American football coach who is the Assistant offensive line coach for the Houston Texans of the National Football League (NFL).

College career
Popovich was a four-year starter as left guard on the Fresno State Bulldogs football team from 2004 to 2007. He was also named a unanimous Freshman All-American in 2005.

Coaching career
Popovich coached at the collegiate level for 5 seasons, working in various colleges such as Los Angeles Valley, Fresno City, Utah State, and Minot State before joining the Patriots' staff in 2016. He was part of the Patriots coaching staff that won Super Bowl LI. In the game, the Patriots defeated the Atlanta Falcons by a score of 34–28 in overtime. Popovich won his second Super Bowl title when the Patriots defeated the Los Angeles Rams in Super Bowl LIII. In 2020 it was announced that he would become the co-offensive line coach  with Carmen Bricilloin order to replace Dante Scarnecchia.

On July 23, 2021, despite Bill Belichick desiring to keep Popovich on his offensive staff, it was reported that Popovich would not be coaching for the Patriots in 2021 due to reasons relating to the COVID-19 vaccine.

Popovich was hired by Jon Sumrall at Troy in January, 2022 to be the offensive line coach for the Trojans.

On February 23, 2023, Popovich was hired by the Houston Texans to be their Assistant offensive line coach.

Personal life
Popovich is married to his wife Jessica, and they have two sons.  He is related to NBA coaching legend Gregg Popovich.

References

External links 
 Fresno State Bulldogs bio
 Minot State Beavers bio
 New England Patriots bio

1985 births
Living people
Fresno State Bulldogs football players
Utah State Aggies football coaches
Minot State Beavers football coaches
New England Patriots coaches
Players of American football from California
People from Madera County, California